Valley East (Vallée-Est in French) is a district of the city of Greater Sudbury, Ontario, Canada.

First incorporated in 1973 as a separate town within the Regional Municipality of Sudbury, Valley East was so named because it comprised the eastern half of the Sudbury Basin. The largest of the six towns in the Regional Municipality, it was reincorporated as a city in 1997 due to continued population growth. On January 1, 2001, the city and the Regional Municipality were dissolved and amalgamated into the city of Greater Sudbury.

Before the amalgamation, Valley East was Northern Ontario's sixth-largest city, ranking after Timmins and before Kenora. According to the Canadian census of 2001, the last one that recorded Valley East as a separate entity, the city had a population of 22,374.

In the Canada 2011 Census, Valley East's main neighbourhoods were grouped as the population centre (or urban area) of Valley East, with a population of 20,676 and a population density of 368.9/km2, although the boundaries of the urban area do not correspond to those of the former municipality.

Valley East is now divided between Wards 5, 6 and 7 on Greater Sudbury City Council, and is represented by councillors Robert Kirwan, René Lapierre and Mike Jakubo .

Education

Hanmer students: those in the English catholic stream attend St-Anne and Bishop Carter, those in the English public stream attend Redwood Acres and Confederation those in the French catholic stream attend Notre Dame and Horizon those in the French public stream attend Foyer-Jeunesse and Hanmer both of these schools are neighboured.

Val Thérèse students: those in the English catholic stream attend St-Anne and Bishop Carter, those in the English public stream attend Redwood Acres and Confederation those in the French catholic steam attend St-Joseph St-Thérèse and Horizon those in the French public stream attend Foyer-Jeunesse and Hanmer both of these schools are neighboured.

Val Caron students: those in the English catholic stream attend Immaculate Conception and Bishop Carter, those in the English public stream attend Valleyview and Confederation those in the French catholic stream attend Jean-Paul II and Horizon those in the French public stream attend De La Découverte and Hanmer.

Blezard Valley students: those in the English catholic stream attend Immaculate Conception and Bishop Carter, those in the English public stream attend Valleyview and Confederation those in the French catholic stream attend Jean-Paul II and Horizon those in the French public stream attend De La Découverte and Hanmer

Valley East Days
Valley East Days is the largest Free Family Festival in Northern Ontario, and celebrated its 43rd year in 2018. This three-day long festival has included big musical acts, such as Trooper & Chilliwack in 2017. The festival typically attracts over 25,000 patrons.

Notable people
Ronald Duguay, NHL hockey player

References

External links
Valley East today
 History of Valley East at Greater Sudbury Heritage Museums

Neighbourhoods in Greater Sudbury
Populated places established in 1973
Populated places disestablished in 2000
Former cities in Ontario
1973 establishments in Ontario
2000 disestablishments in Ontario